David Anthony McDermott (born 6 February 1988) is an English professional footballer who plays as a winger. He played in the Football League for Walsall.

Career

Walsall
Born in Stourbridge, West Midlands, McDermott progressed through the Walsall youth system and he earned a scholarship place ahead of the 2004–05 season. He made his first team debut in a 1–0 defeat to Sheffield Wednesday in the League Cup after entering the game as a substitute in the 77th minute on 25 August 2004, which was his only appearance of the 2004–05 season. He finished the 2005–06 season with three appearances and he signed his first professional contract with Walsall in May 2006. He joined Southern League Premier Division club Halesowen Town on an initial one-month loan on 4 January 2007, where he made four appearances and scored two goals. He finished the 2007–08 season with 15 appearances for Walsall and he was released by the club on 7 May 2008.

Kidderminster Harriers
He joined Conference Premier club Kidderminster Harriers on a free transfer in August following a trial. He made his debut in a 1–1 draw against Lewes as an 80th-minute substitute on 9 August. He finished the 2008–09 season with 29 appearances and one goal for Kidderminster and he signed a new one-year contract in July 2009. McDermott was re-signed by Halesowen on an initial one-month loan on 17 February 2010 to try to regain full fitness. He finished the loan in March with five appearances and two goals. He was invited back to pre-season training by Kidderminster after he finished the 2009–10 season with 25 appearances and one goal.

York City
He joined fellow Conference Premier team York City on trial in July 2010 and he played in a 1–0 pre-season friendly defeat to Hull City, with manager Martin Foyle saying he was impressed by McDermott's performance. Ahead of the 2–0 friendly defeat to Barnsley in which McDermott featured, Foyle spoke to the player's agent ahead of deciding over offering him a contract. After scoring from a "weakly struck" direct free kick to score the winning goal in a 1–0 friendly victory over Morecambe, McDermott was offered a contract with York and he signed for the club on 28 July 2010. He made his debut as an 82nd-minute substitute in a 2–2 draw at Bath City on 21 August 2010. Having made four appearances for the club, McDermott was released by York on 5 October 2-1- before being re-signed on another month-to-month contract on 19 October by new manager Gary Mills. His first appearance since returning was in a 2–0 victory at Kidderminster in the FA Cup fourth qualifying round on 23 October 2010, which was also his first start for York. McDermott scored his first goal for York in a 2–0 victory over Southport on 23 November. He agreed a new contract with York on 27 December 2010 that would keep him at the club until the end of the 2010–11 season, which would be signed in January 2011.

Despite having yet to agree terms on a new contract he was invited back to pre-season training with York, before re-signing on non-contract terms on 1 July 2011. He suffered a foot injury during a 1–1 draw with Garforth Town in pre-season on 11 July 2011, which required an X-ray. By October 2011, Mills was looking to loan McDermott out in order for him to play regular first team football.

Later career
Having been unable to break into the first team at York, McDermott left the club on 6 January 2012 and subsequently went on trial with Conference Premier rivals AFC Telford United. He signed for AFC Telford on non-contract terms on 6 February 2012 but did not make any appearances for them. He later joined Southern League Premier Division side Stourbridge for the rest of the 2011–12 season. McDermott signed for Northern Premier League Premier Division club Rushall Olympic on 29 September 2012 and played for them in the 2012–13 and 2013–14 seasons. He joined Conference North team Worcester City on 7 August 2014.

Career statistics

References

External links

1988 births
Living people
Sportspeople from Stourbridge
English footballers
Association football wingers
Walsall F.C. players
Halesowen Town F.C. players
Kidderminster Harriers F.C. players
York City F.C. players
AFC Telford United players
Stourbridge F.C. players
Rushall Olympic F.C. players
Worcester City F.C. players
English Football League players
Southern Football League players
National League (English football) players
Northern Premier League players